RFA Eddyreef (A202) was an Eddy-class coastal tanker of the Royal Fleet Auxiliary.

Built by the Caledon Shipbuilding & Engineering Company, Dundee, the ship was launched on 28 May 1953, and entered service on 23 October 1953. 

Eddyreef was laid up in 1958, and departed from Devonport, Plymouth, in tow for demolition at Willebroek, Belgium, in March 1964.

References

 

Eddy-class coastal tankers
1953 ships
Ships built in Dundee